Cynoglossus lingua, commonly known as the long tongue sole or textile tongue sole is a species of fish found along the coast of the Philippines, Thailand and the Malay peninsula, Myanmar, the Bay of Bengal and as far west as the Red Sea.

References
 Fishbase

Cynoglossidae
Fish described in 1822